My Baggage, formerly known as Uni Baggage, is a luggage delivery company established in 2009. The service is used mainly by students, expats, holidaymakers, travel nomads, sports teams, armed forces, and people moving abroad. It arranges the collection and delivery of its customers’ items through major couriers for a lower cost compared to customers booking transportation directly.

History 
The courier service was founded by entrepreneur Paul Stewart after he had experienced difficulties moving his personal belongings from his home in Northern Ireland to the University of Edinburgh, where he was studying. Stewart established the business in his second year of studying an engineering degree at the university by using his student loan as funding. 

The company is based in Belfast. Since it was founded, My Baggage has expanded into worldwide shipping and since May 2015, it currently offers the services of DHL Express, and Parcelforce.

By 2014, the company had annual sales in excess of £1 million.

Uni Baggage announced the launch of its VIF Service (Very Important Fresher) in September 2014. This new service was covered by a number of media outlets including the BBC, Financial Times, CNBC, The Guardian, The Independent, The Telegraph. The VIF Service allowed students to travel to university in luxury while their belongings were transported separately.

Uni Baggage launched several new routes from Ireland to Europe and the US in 2015. In April 2018, the company signed a new $1 million deal with US-based courier companies to transport customer items between 500 new routes in and outside the country.

In 2019, the company changed its name to My Baggage to appeal to a broader range of customers.

References 

Logistics companies of the United Kingdom
Transport companies established in 2009
Companies of Northern Ireland
2009 establishments in Northern Ireland